The discography of Australian rock band Something for Kate, consists of seven studio albums, one live album, four compilation albums, three extended plays and 28 singles.

Albums

Studio albums

Live albums

Compilation albums

Video albums

Extended plays

Singles

Other appearances

Notes

References

Alternative rock discographies
Rock music group discographies
Discographies of Australian artists